Alsophila albidosquamata,  synonyms  Cyathea albidosquamata and Sphaeropteris albidosquamata, is a species of tree fern native to the Maluku Islands, New Guinea and the Bismarck Archipelago, where it grows in rain forest and montane forest at an altitude of . The trunk is erect and about 2 m tall. Fronds are bi- or tripinnate and 1–1.5 m in length. The lower surface of the rachis is covered in scales and the stipe has scattered scales throughout its length. These are glossy and pale, with dull, fragile edges. Sori occur near the fertile pinnule midvein and have flat indusia which resemble small saucers.

References

albidosquamata
Flora of the Maluku Islands
Flora of New Guinea
Flora of the Bismarck Archipelago